MRF Challenge is an open-wheel motorsport formula based in India organized by Madras Motor Sports Club. This was India's first and only FIA approved and inscribed international series. This was promoted as a Winter series where young and upcoming racing drivers could get valuable seat and track time during the off-season months in competitive tracks in Asia. This was supported by MRF Ltd in its entirety and was a unique concept of "Arrive and Drive" which meant that the drivers would not have the hassle of making all arrangements. They would pay for a seat in the Championship and everything would be taken care of by the organizers.

Point system

Champions

MRF Challenge Formula 2000

External links
 
 

 
Auto racing series in India
Formula racing
Formula racing series
One-make series
Recurring sporting events established in 2013